Costas Elia() born 9 June 1976 in Famagusta, Cyprus is a reitred Cypriot football striker who has played for the national team of Cyprus. He also played for Anagennisi Dherynia, Skoda Xanthi, Olympiakos Nicosia, Enosis Neon Paralimni and Alki Larnaca.

External links
 
 

1976 births
Living people
People from Famagusta
Cypriot footballers
Cyprus international footballers
Association football forwards
AEK Larnaca FC players
Enosis Neon Paralimni FC players
Xanthi F.C. players
Olympiakos Nicosia players
Anagennisi Deryneia FC players
Cypriot expatriate footballers
Expatriate footballers in Greece
Cypriot expatriates in Greece
Super League Greece players
Cypriot First Division players
ASIL Lysi players